Nathan Mark Teut (pronounced "TOYT") (born March 11, 1976) is an American former baseball pitcher.

Career
Teut was drafted in the 4th round of the 1997 MLB draft by the Chicago Cubs. Neut spent one year each in the Marlins and Milwaukee Brewers organizations, but spent most of his career in the Cubs organization. After retiring from baseball, Nate joined the front office staff at the Iowa Cubs doing sales and worked his way up to the position of Assistant General Manager and Executive Vice President. Departing the Iowa Cubs in the summer of 2017, Nate joined the Des Moines Buccaneers Hockey Club (USHL) as the organizations President following the change in team ownership.

External links

1976 births
Living people
Albuquerque Isotopes players
American expatriate baseball players in Canada
Baseball players from Iowa
Calgary Cannons players
Daytona Cubs players
Florida Marlins players
Indianapolis Indians players
Iowa Cubs players
Iowa State Cyclones baseball players
Major League Baseball pitchers
Nashua Pride players
People from Newton, Iowa
Rockford Cubbies players
West Tennessee Diamond Jaxx players
Williamsport Cubs players